This is an incomplete list of films produced in Cuba in chronological order. For an A-Z list of films currently on Wikipedia see :Category:Cuban films.

1890s

1900s

1910s

1920s

1930s

1940s

1950s

1960s

1970s

1980s

1990s

2000s

2010s

2020s

See also

 Cinema of Cuba
 Cinema of the Caribbean
 Instituto Cubano del Arte e Industria Cinematográficos

References

External links
 Cuban film at the Internet Movie Database

Lists of films by country of production

Films